In the Swedish calendar it was a common year starting on Thursday, one day ahead of the Julian and ten days behind the Gregorian calendar.

Events 
 January–March 
 January 9 – The Jamaican town of Port Royal, a center of trade in the Western Hemisphere and, at the time, the largest city in the Caribbean, is destroyed by a fire. British ships in the harbor are able to rescue much of the merchandise that has been unloaded on the docks, but the inventory in marketplaces in town is destroyed.
 January 14 – 1703 Apennine earthquakes: The magnitude 6.7 Norcia earthquake affects Central Italy with a maximum Mercalli intensity of XI (Extreme). With a death toll of 6,240–9,761, it is the first in a sequence of three destructive events.
 January 16 – 1703 Apennine earthquakes: The magnitude 6.2 Montereale earthquake causes damage at Accumoli, Armatrice, Cittareale, and Montereale, with a maximum Mercalli intensity of VIII (Severe).
 January 30 (December 14 of previous year in the Chinese calendar) – In Japan,  Forty-seven rōnin assassinate daimyō Kira Yoshinaka, the enemy of their former lord Asano Naganori, at his own mansion as a vengeance; 46 of the 47 samurai commit seppuku, a ritual suicide on March 20 (February 4 in the Chinese calendar).
 February 2 – 1703 Apennine earthquakes: The magnitude 6.7 L'Aquila earthquake affects Central Italy, with a maximum Mercalli intensity of X (Extreme). In the final large event (an example of Coulomb stress transfer), damage occurs as far distant as Rome, with landslides, liquefaction, slope failures and at least 2,500 deaths.
 February 20–March 10 – War of the Spanish Succession: Siege of Kehl – French forces under the command of the Duc de Villars capture the fortress of the Holy Roman Empire at Kehl, opposite Strasbourg on the Rhine.
 February – Soldiers at Fort Louis de la Mobile celebrate Mardi Gras in Mobile, starting the tradition for Mobile, Alabama.
 March 1 – The Recruiting Act 1703 goes into effect in England, providing for the forcible enlistment of able-bodied but unemployed men into the English Army and Royal Navy in order to fight in Queen Anne's War in North America. The Act expires at the end of February 1704. 
 March 15 – The landmark English court case of Rose v Royal College of Physicians is decided by the Court of Queen's Bench, beginning the end of the monopoly that the Royal College of Physicians has over the practice of medicine.
 March 19 – The Siege of Guadeloupe begins as an English expeditionary force, led by Christopher Codrington and Hovenden Walker, lands at Basse-Terre and attempts to take over the French-held island. The English fleet departs on May 15 after being unable to capture Guadeloupe.
 March 20 – The Akō incident occurs in Japan as 46 independent samurai (rōnin) carry out an order of seppuku (ritual suicide) for the revenge murder of a high-ranking government official, Kira Yoshinaka, on January 30.  The punishment is given by the shōgun, Tokugawa Tsunayoshi.  The story continues to be dramatized more than 300 years later in Chūshingura theater, novels and film. 
 March 21 – Jeanne Guyon is freed in Paris after more than seven years imprisonment for heresy in the Bastille.

 April–June 
 April 21 – The Company of Quenching of Fire (i.e., a fire brigade) is founded in Edinburgh, Scotland.
 May 26 – Portugal joins the Grand Alliance.
 May 27 (May 16 OS) – The city of Saint Petersburg,  Russia is founded, following Peter the Great's reconquest of Ingria from Sweden during the Great Northern War.
 June 15 – Rákóczi's War of Independence: Hungarians rebel under Prince Francis II Rákóczi.
 June 19 – Bavarian troops, who during the so-called Bavarian Rummel have invaded Tyrol, besiege Kufstein. Fires break out on the outskirts that engulf the town, destroy it and reach the powder store of the supposedly impregnable fortress. The enormous gunpowder supplies explode and Kufstein has to surrender on 20 June. This same day the Tyrolese surrender in Wörgl; two days later Rattenberg is captured and Innsbruck is cleared without a fight on 25 June.
 June – The completed Icelandic census of 1703 is presented in the Althing, the first complete census of any country.

 July–September 
 July 26 – After their victories at the Pontlatzer Bridge and the Brenner Pass, Tyrolese farmers drive out the Bavarian Elector, Maximilian II Emanuel, from North Tyrol and thus prevent the Bavarian Army, which is allied with France, from marching on Vienna during the War of the Spanish Succession. This success, at low cost, is the signal for the rebellion of the Tyrolese against Bavaria, and Elector Maximilian II Emanuel has to flee from Innsbruck. The Bavarian Army withdraws through Seefeld in Tirol back to Bavaria.
 July 29–31 – Daniel Defoe is placed in a pillory in London, then imprisoned for four months for the crime of seditious libel after publishing his satirical political pamphlet The Shortest Way with the Dissenters (1702) (his release is granted in mid-November).
 August 23 – Edirne event: Sultan Mustafa II of the Ottoman Empire is dethroned.
 September 7 – War of the Spanish Succession: The town of Breisach is retaken for France by Camille d'Hostun, duc de Tallard.
 September 12 – War of the Spanish Succession: Habsburg Archduke Charles is proclaimed King of Spain, but never exercises full rule.

 October–December 
 October 11 – Nine Roman Catholic residents of the French village of Sainte-Cécile-d'Andorge are massacred by a mob of more than 800 French Huguenot Protestants, the Camisards.  A reprisal against Protestants in the nearby village of Branoux is made less than three weeks later.
 October 23 – Hannah Twynnoy, a 24-year-old barmaid in Malmesbury, Wiltshire, becomes the first person to be killed in Great Britain by a tiger. While working at the White Lion Inn, where a group of wild animals is on exhibit, she is mauled after bothering the tiger.
 October 30 – More than 47 Huguenots in the village of Branoux-les-Taillades are massacred by Roman Catholic vigilantes in reprisal for the October 11 attack on nearby Sainte-Cécile, slightly more than two miles away.
 November 15
 War of the Spanish Succession: Battle of Speyerbach (in modern-day Germany) – The French defeat a German relief army, allowing the French to take the besieged town of Landau two days later, for which Tallard is made a Marshal of France.
 Rákóczi's War of Independence: Battle of Zvolen (in modern-day Slovakia) – The Kurucs defeat the Austrians and their allies (Denmark, Hungary and the Serbs).
 November 19 – The Man in the Iron Mask dies in the Bastille.
 November 30 – Isaac Newton is elected president of the Royal Society in London, a position he will hold until his death in 1727.
 December 7–10 (November 26–29 O.S.) – The Great Storm of 1703 ravages southern England and the English Channel, killing at least 8,000, mostly at sea. The Eddystone Lighthouse off Plymouth is destroyed in the storm together with its designer Henry Winstanley.
 December 27 – Portugal and England sign the Methuen Treaty, which gives preference to Portuguese wines imported into England.
 December 28 – Ahmed III succeeds the deposed Mustafa II as Ottoman Emperor.

 Date unknown 
 French-born imposter George Psalmanazar arrives in London.
 Between 1702 and 1703, an epidemic of smallpox breaks out in Quebec, in which 2,000-3,000 people die (300-400 in Quebec City).

Births

January–March 
 January 1 – Heinrich Sigismund von der Heyde, Prussian army commander (d. 1765)
 January 2 – George Cholmondeley, 3rd Earl of Cholmondeley, English politician (d. 1770)
 January 3 – Daniel-Charles Trudaine, French administrator and civil engineer (d. 1769)
 January 5
 James Hamilton, 5th Duke of Hamilton, Scottish peer (d. 1743)
 Paul d'Albert de Luynes, French archbishop (d. 1788)
 January 8 – André Levret, French obstetrician who practised medicine in Paris (d. 1780)
 January 10 – Christoph Birkmann, German theologian and minister (d. 1771)
 January 15
 Henriette Louise de Bourbon, French princess by birth, member of the House of Bourbon (d. 1772)
 John Brydges, Marquess of Carnarvon, English politician (d. 1727)
 Johann Ernst Hebenstreit, German physician and naturalist (d. 1757)
 January 20 – Joseph-Hector Fiocco, Belgian composer and violinist (d. 1741)
 January 22 – Antoine Walsh, Irish-French slave trader and Jacobite (d. 1763)
 January 29 – Carlmann Kolb, German priest (d. 1765)
 January 31 – André-Joseph Panckoucke, French author and bookseller (d. 1753)
 February 2 – Richard Morris, Welsh writer and editor (d. 1779)
 February 3 – Jean Philippe de Bela, French military figure and Basque writer and historian (d. 1796)
 February 4
 Jean Saas, French historian and bibliographer (d. 1774)
 Andrew Stone, significant figure in the British royal circle, Member of Parliament (d. 1773)
 February 5 – Gilbert Tennent, Irish-born religious leader (d. 1764)
 February 8
 Corrado Giaquinto, Italian Rococo painter (d. 1765)
 François-Pierre Rigaud de Vaudreuil, soldier in New France (d. 1779)
 February 13 – Robert Dodsley, English bookseller, poet, playwright and miscellaneous writer (d. 1764)
 February 27 – Lord Sidney Beauclerk, English politician and fortune hunter (d. 1744)
 March 1 – Philip Tisdall, Attorney-General for Ireland (d. 1777)
 March 4 – Nicolas René Berryer, French magistrate and politician (d. 1762)
 March 5 (N. S.) – Vasily Trediakovsky, Russian poet (d. 1768)
 March 10 – Peter Warren, British Royal Navy officer (d. 1752)
 March 21 – Georg Andreas Sorge, Thuringian organist (d. 1778)
 March 23 – Cajsa Warg, Swedish cookbook author (d. 1769)

April–June 
 April 8 – Benoît-Joseph Boussu, French violin maker (d. 1773)
 April 10 – Pierre Daubenton, French lawyer (d. 1776)
 April 24 – José Francisco de Isla, Spanish Jesuit (d. 1781)
 May 2 – James West, English antiquary (d. 1772)
 May 8 – Johann Gottlob Harrer, German composer and choir leader (d. 1755)
 May 10 – John Winslow, British Army officer (d. 1774)
 May 12 – Countess Sophie Theodora of Castell-Remlingen, German noblewoman (d. 1777)
 May 14 – David Brearly, delegate to the U.S. Constitutional Convention (d. 1785)
 May 18
 Jean Daullé, French engraver (d. 1763)
 İbrahim Hakkı Erzurumi, Turkish Sufi saint (d. 1780)
 May 20 – René Lièvre de Besançon, French archer (d. 1739)
 June 6 – Edmund Law, priest in the Church of England (d. 1787)
 June 10 – Walter Butler, 16th Earl of Ormonde, Irish landowner (d. 1783)
 June 21 – Joseph Lieutaud, French physician (d. 1780)
 June 24 – Anne van Keppel, Countess of Albemarle (d. 1789)
 June 26 – Thomas Clap, first president of Yale University (d. 1767)
 June 28 – John Wesley, English founder of Methodism and anti-slavery activist (d. 1791)

July–September 
 July 7 – Kenrick Prescot, English Anglican priest and academic (d. 1779)
 July 9 – Edward Shippen III, American merchant and mayor of Philadelphia (d. 1781)
 July 12 – Nicholas Hewetson, Anglican priest in Ireland (d. 1761)
 July 17 – Thomas Hancock, merchant in colonial Boston (d. 1764)
 August 2 – Lorenzo Ricci, Italian Jesuit leader (d. 1775)
 August 4 – Louis, Duke of Orléans, member of the royal family of France (d. 1752)
 August 9 – Muhammad Ibrahim, claimant to the throne of India (d. 1746)
 August 15 – Jacob Bicker Raije, writer from the Northern Netherlands (d. 1777)
 August 24 – François-Marie Le Marchand de Lignery, colonial military leader in the French province of Canada (d. 1759)
 August 30 – Jean-Louis Calandrini, Genevan scientist (d. 1758)
 September 1 – Just Fabritius, Danish merchant (d. 1766)
 September 3 – Johann Theodor of Bavaria, cardinal (d. 1763)
 September 6 – John Harris, British landowner and politician (d. 1768)
 September 15 – Guillaume-François Rouelle, French chemist (d. 1770)
 September 23 – Charlotte Howe, Viscountess Howe, Hanover-born British courtier and politician (d. 1782)
 September 29
 François Boucher, French painter (d. 1770)
 Baltzer Fleischer, Norwegian civil servant and county governor (d. 1767)
 François Fresneau de La Gataudière, French botanist and scientist (d. 1770)
 Philip Syng, Irish-born American silversmith (d. 1789)

October–December 
 October 3 – Franz Christoph Janneck, Austrian painter in the Baroque style (d. 1761)
 October 5 – Jonathan Edwards, North American revivalist preacher (d. 1758)
 October 6 – Louis de Beaufort, French-Dutch historian known for his critical approach to the history of Rome (d. 1795)
 October 7 – Frederick, Hereditary Prince of Baden-Durlach, German hereditary prince (d. 1732)
 October 13
 Andrea Belli, Maltese architect and businessman (d. 1772)
 Otto Thott, Danish Count (d. 1785)
 October 15 – Benigna Gottliebe von Trotta genannt Treyden, Duchess consort of Courland (d. 1782)
 October 16
 Joachim Faiguet de Villeneuve, French economist (d. 1781)
 Henry Fane of Wormsley, English politician (d. 1777)
 October 22 – Edward Rudge, English politician (d. 1763)
 October 23 – Sir Alexander Dick, 3rd Baronet, Scottish landowner and physician (d. 1785)
 October 28
 Andreas Bjørn, Danish merchant (d. 1750)
 Antoine Deparcieux, French mathematician (d. 1768)
 October 30 – James Hill, Scottish surgeon who advocated curative excision for cancer (d. 1776)
 November 1 – Frederik Danneskiold-Samsøe, Danish politician (d. 1770)
 November 10 – Carlo Zuccari, Italian composer and violinist (d. 1792)
 November 17 – Adam Miller, German-born pioneer in the colony of Virginia (d. 1783)
 November 18 – Andrew Rollo, 5th Lord Rollo, Scottish army commander in Canada and Dominica during the Seven Years' War (d. 1765)
 November 22
 Walter Pompe, Flemish master-sculptor (d. 1777)
 Balthasar Riepp, German-Austrian painter (d. 1764)
 November 23 – Louise Levesque, French femme de lettres (d. 1743)
 November 25 – Jean-François Séguier, French astronomer and botanist (d. 1784)
 November 26 – Theophilus Cibber, English actor and writer (d. 1758)
 November 27 – James De Lancey, colonial governor of the Province of New York (d. 1760)
 December 2 – Ferdinand Konščak, Croatian Jesuit missionary, explorer and cartographer (d. 1759)
 December 9 – Chester Moore Hall, British lawyer and inventor who produced the first achromatic lenses (d. 1771)
 December 12 – Simon Carl Stanley, Danish sculptor of English parentage (d. 1761)
 December 15
 Johann Martin Boltzius, German born (d. 1765)
 Frederick Ernest of Brandenburg-Kulmbach, member of the Brandenburg-Kulmbach branch of the House of Hohenzollern (d. 1762)
 December 23 – Stephen Cornwallis, career British Army officer and politician (d. 1743)
 December 24
 Aleksei Chirikov, Russian navigator (d. 1748)
 Christen Lindencrone, Danish landowner and supercargo of the Danish Asia Company (d. 1772)
unknown date – Johann Gottlieb Graun, German Baroque/Classical era composer and violinist (d. 1771)

Deaths 
 January 9 – Úrsula Micaela Morata, Spanish writer (b. 1628)
 January 11 – Johann Georg Graevius, German classical scholar and critic (b. 1632)
 January 16 – Erik Dahlbergh, Swedish engineer, soldier and field marshal (b. 1625)
 February 15 – Robert Kerr, 1st Marquess of Lothian (b. 1636)
 February 18 
 Thomas Hyde, English orientalist (b. 1636)
 Ilona Zrínyi, Hungarian heroine  (b. 1643)
 February 20 – John Churchill, Marquess of Blandford, British noble (b. 1686)
 February 28 – Sir Roger Twisden, 2nd Baronet of England (b. 1640)

 March 3 – Robert Hooke, English scientist (b. 1635)
 March 12 – Aubrey de Vere, 20th Earl of Oxford (b. 1627)
 March 31 – Johann Christoph Bach, German composer (b. 1642)
 April 1 – Thomas Jermyn, 2nd Baron Jermyn, Governor of Jersey (b. 1633)
 April 20 – Lancelot Addison, English royal chaplain (b. 1632)
 May 3 – Sir Richard Grobham Howe, 2nd Baronet, English Member of Parliament (b. 1621)
 May 6 – John Murray, 1st Marquess of Atholl (b. 1631)
 May 16 – Charles Perrault, French author (b. 1628)
 May 26 
 Louis-Hector de Callière, French politician (b. 1648)
 Samuel Pepys, English civil servant and diarist (b. 1633)
 June 14 – Jean Herauld Gourville, French adventurer (b. 1625)
 June 19 – William Stanhope, English politician (b. 1626)
 July 17 – Roemer Vlacq I, Dutch naval captain (b. 1637)
 July 20
 Changning, prince during the Qing Dynasty (b. 1657)
 Statz Friedrich von Fullen, German-born nobleman (b. 1638)
 August 10 – Fuquan (prince), Chinese Qing Dynasty prince (b. 1653)
 August 21 – Thomas Tryon, British hat maker (b. 1634)
 September 22 – Vincenzo Viviani, Italian mathematician and scientist (b. 1622)
 September 25 – Archibald Campbell, 1st Duke of Argyll, Scottish privy councillor (b. 1658)
 September 29 – Charles de Saint-Évremond, French soldier (b. 1610)
 September 30 – Walter J. Johnson, English explorer, fur trader (b. 1611)
 October 3 – Alessandro Melani, Italian composer (b. 1639)
 October 5 – Anthony Ettrick, English politician (b. 1622)
 October 8 – Tomás Marín de Poveda, 1st Marquis of Cañada Hermosa, Royal Governor of Chile (b. 1650)
 October 11 – Roger Cave, English politician (b. 1655)
 October 14 – Thomas Kingo, Danish bishop (b. 1634)
 October 28 – John Wallis, English mathematician (b. 1616)

 November 19 – The Man in the Iron Mask (identity unknown)
 November 27 – Henry Winstanley, English engineer (b. 1644)
 November 30 – Nicolas de Grigny, French organist and composer (b. 1672)
 December 28 – Mustafa II, Ottoman Sultan (b. 1664)
 date unknown 
 Phetracha, king of Ayutthaya (b. 1632)
 Anastasiya Dabizha, princess of Moldavia and Wallachia and Hetmana of Ukraine.

References